The 1986–87 Dallas Sidekicks season was the third season of the Dallas Sidekicks indoor soccer club. The team was purchased in the off-season by a group of 37 limited partners under the banner Sidekicks I, Ltd. The team was purchased from Don Carter in order to prevent filing for bankruptcy. This season saw the team win the MISL Championship for the first time in franchise history.

Roster

Schedule and results

Preseason

Regular season

Postseason

Final standings

y – division champions, x – clinched playoff berth, * - The New York Express folded midseason.

External links
 1986-87 Dallas Sidekicks season statistics at Kicks Fan fansite

Dallas Sidekicks (1984–2004) seasons
Dallas Sidekicks
Dallas Sidekicks